The following are the national records in track cycling in Japan maintained by the Japan Cycling Federation.

Men
Key to tables:

Women

References
General
 Japanese records 14 October 2022
Specific

External links
 Japan Cycling Federation web site

Japan
Records in track cycling
Track cycling
track cycling